The following is a list of colleges and universities in the U.S. state of  Connecticut.  This list includes all schools that grant degrees at an associates level or higher, and are either accredited or in the process of accreditation by a recognized accrediting agency.

The state's flagship public university is the University of Connecticut, which is also the largest school in the state. The remainder of the state's public institutions constitute the Connecticut State Colleges & Universities, comprising four state universities, twelve community colleges, and an online school, Charter Oak State College. Connecticut is also the home of one of the five federally-run service academies, the United States Coast Guard Academy.

The oldest college in the state, founded in 1701, is Yale University.

Institutions

Unaccredited institutions
Two institutions are licensed by the Connecticut Office of Higher Education to offer academic degrees, but are not accredited by a recognized accrediting body:

The Graduate Institute in Bethany
Legion of Christ College of Humanities in Cheshire

Out-of-state institutions
Several institutions based in other states offer, or have offered, degree programs at sites in Connecticut, under license from the state:
 Brown University of Rhode Island offers a master's program in biology at a Pfizer facility in Groton.
 Embry–Riddle Aeronautical University of Florida offers degree programs at a Pratt & Whitney facility in Hartford.
 Rensselaer at Hartford is a branch campus of New York-based Rensselaer Polytechnic Institute, offering graduate programs.
 The for-profit schools Gibbs College and University of Phoenix previously each had a branch in Norwalk. Another Gibbs branch, later branded as a Sanford–Brown, was located in Farmington.
 The Robert Larner College of Medicine of the University of Vermont has a branch at the Western Connecticut Health Network facilities in Danbury and Norwalk.

Defunct institutions
Several schools that once operated in the state have closed, discontinued their degree programs, or moved to other states:

Gallery

See also

 List of college athletic programs in Connecticut
 Higher education in the United States
 Lists of American institutions of higher education

References and notes
General

Specific

Connecticut, List of colleges and universities in
Universities and colleges